Nadia Nurhussein (born 1974) is an American academic and author specialized in African-American literature, culture, and poetics. She is an associate professor of English and Africana studies at the Johns Hopkins Zanvyl Krieger School of Arts and Sciences.

Education 
Nurhussein completed a Ph.D. in English at University of California, Berkeley in 2004. She received fellowships from the Ford Foundation, Beinecke Library, and the American Council of Learned Societies.

Career 
Nurhussein taught English at Mount Holyoke College from 2004 to 2005. She was a member of the faculty at University of Massachusetts Boston where she taught English from 2005 to 2016. In 2017, Nurhussein joined the Johns Hopkins Zanvyl Krieger School of Arts and Sciences as an associate professor of English and Africana studies. She specializes in African-American literature, culture, and poetics.

Selected works

References

External links 

 

1974 births
African-American women academics
American women academics
African-American academics
University of California, Berkeley alumni
Mount Holyoke College faculty
University of Massachusetts Boston faculty
Johns Hopkins University faculty
21st-century American women writers
African-American women writers
African-American non-fiction writers
21st-century American non-fiction writers
Living people
21st-century African-American women
20th-century African-American people
20th-century African-American women